Dark House may refer to:

Film
 Dark House (2009 film), an American horror film directed by Darin Scott
 The Dark House (2009 Polish film), a horror film directed by Wojciech Smarzowski
 The Dark House (2009 Dutch film), a thriller directed by Will Koopman
 Dark House (2014 film), an American horror film directed by Victor Salva

Other uses
 Darkhouse, a 2005 novel by Alex Barclay
 Darkhouse (fishing) or ice shanty, a portable shelter for ice fishing